Siem Pang Wildlife Sanctuary is a  wildlife sanctuary located in Santepheap, Thma Keo, and Prek Meas communes, Siem Pang District, Stung Treng Province, created on November 6, 2019, according to Sub-decree no.161 ANKr.BK. This combined the two wildlife sanctuaries: Siem Pang and Western Siem Pang, which were established in 2016.

History 
 May 9, 2016: Siem Pang Wildlife Sanctuary, created according to Sub-decree no.86 ANKr.BK.

 May 9, 2016: Western Siem Pang Wildlife Sanctuary, created according to Sub-decree no.76 ANKr.BK.

 February 25, 2014: Siem Pang Protected Forest (known as ), created according to Sub-decree no.77 ANKr.BK, administered by Ministry of Agriculture, Forestry and Fisheries. It was part of a large protected area complex that includes the Xe Pian protected area in Laos and the Virachey National Park in Cambodia, and Chư Mom Ray National Park in Vietnam. The area is important for several critically endangered bird species including the giant ibis and white-shouldered ibis.

References

External 
 Cambodian jewel protected by BirdLife International
 New protection for giant ibis by Phnom Penh Post
 Cambodia protects forest for giant ibis by Mongabay

Wildlife sanctuaries of Cambodia
Protected areas of Cambodia
Protected areas established in 2014
Forests of Cambodia
2014 establishments in Cambodia